Timme Fred Philip Hoyng (born 7 August 1976) is a Dutch former field hockey player who played as a midfielder or forward.

Hoyng played a total of 138 matches for the Dutch national team from 2000 until 2009 in which he scored 12 goals.  He was a member of the national team that finished fourth at the 2008 Summer Olympics.

References

External links
 

1976 births
Living people
Dutch male field hockey players
Male field hockey midfielders
Male field hockey forwards
Olympic field hockey players of the Netherlands
2006 Men's Hockey World Cup players
Field hockey players at the 2008 Summer Olympics
Sportspeople from Amstelveen
Amsterdamsche Hockey & Bandy Club players
Men's Hoofdklasse Hockey players